Gert Bo Jacobsen (born 28 December 1961) is a Danish former professional boxer who competed between 1982 and 1995. He held the WBO welterweight title from February to October 1993.

Professional career

Jacobsen's greatest fights were against Manning Galloway which were all fought in Randers Hallen, Randers, Denmark. The first fight, Jacobsen lost due to a corner retirement, the second fight was a no contest, but Jacobsen finally won the WBO welterweight title from Galloway in the 3rd fight by a decision.

During his career, Jacobsen had economic fights with his promotor Mogens Palle. Jacobsen thought he didn't get enough money for his fights. In his European championship fight against René Weller, Weller got around 600.000 Danish crowns, while Jacobsen only got 50.000 crowns.

In February 1993, Jacobson won the WBO welterweight title against Manning Galloway but was stripped in October of the same year after being forced to withdraw to a fight against Eamonn Loughran because of suffering from the flu.

Personal life
Jacobsen appeared in a television show named Dalton, that was shown in Denmark in 1993.

Jacobsen owns an auto shop in Denmark.

Professional boxing record

See also
 List of welterweight boxing champions

References

External links
 
 

1961 births
Living people
Welterweight boxers
World Boxing Organization champions
Danish male boxers
People from Vesthimmerland Municipality
Sportspeople from the North Jutland Region